Tamara Siler Jones is a writer of fantasy novels.

Her first novel, Ghosts in the Snow, won the Compton Crook Award in 2005. Her second, Threads of Malice, was nominated for the 2006 Gaylactic Spectrum Awards.

Her three books focus on a group of investigators in a society still recovering from a devastating ancient war, in the absence of many of the technologies it once enjoyed. The lead character, Dubric Byerly, is an aging noble, war veteran and widower who has responsibility for peace and security in Castle Faldorrah and its local villages. Along with his squire, Dien, and young assistant pages Lars and Otlee, Dubric solves crimes and enforces the law in Faldorrah.

What makes Dubric so good at his job, but so miserable in his own life, is his secret curse – since his wife's brutal death, he sees the ghosts of people murdered within the scope of his responsibility, and is haunted by these spectres until their killers are brought to justice.

The three books are a combination of fantasy and thriller, with the driving force in the plot being a particular mystery or crime. They contain consistently dark themes but are often balanced with a dry black humor.

Tamara Siler Jones now writes under a semi-pseudonym, Tambo Jones. She has produced additional works featuring Dubric Byerly, including but not limited to The Lord Apparent's Razor, Rabbits and Wasps, and Protection of the Holy Knights.

Books
Ghosts in the Snow (October 26, 2004)
Threads of Malice (October 25, 2005)
Valley of the Soul (October 31, 2006)

References

External links

Living people
21st-century American novelists
American fantasy writers
American women novelists
Women science fiction and fantasy writers
21st-century American women writers
Year of birth missing (living people)